Liberato (died 269 AD) was a Christian martyr from Italy.

Liberato may also refer to:

Liberato (name), a personal name and surname
Liberato (singer), Italian singer

Places
Tenuta di San Liberato, Bracciano, Italy
Liberato Salzano, in Rio Grande do Sul, Brazil

Other
BRP Liberato Picar (PC-377), a Philippine ship